Maria Elisa Mendes Ticon Antonelli (born 25 February 1984) is a Brazilian beach volleyball player.  She competed with Talita Antunes at the 2012 Summer Olympics, qualifying from group E before losing to the Czech team of Kristýna Kolocová and Markéta Sluková in the last 16.

References

1984 births
Living people
Brazilian people of Italian descent
Brazilian women's beach volleyball players
Beach volleyball players at the 2012 Summer Olympics
Olympic beach volleyball players of Brazil

Sportspeople from Rio de Janeiro (state)
21st-century Brazilian women